Psalm 85 is the 85th psalm of the Book of Psalms, one of a series of psalms attributed to the sons of Korah. In the slightly different numbering system used in the Greek Septuagint and Latin Vulgate translations of the Bible, this psalm is Psalm 84.

In the English of the King James Version, this psalm begins: ", thou hast been favourable unto thy land". In Latin, it is known as "Benedixisti Domine terram tuam". In Judaism, it is called "a psalm of returned exiles". The Jerusalem Bible describes it as a "prayer for peace".

The psalm forms a regular part of Jewish, Catholic, Lutheran, Anglican and other Protestant liturgies. It has been paraphrased in hymns and set to music. Its image of Justice and Peace kissing in verse 10  ("righteousness and peace" in versions such as the New International Version) was a popular theme in art work from the Middle Ages through the 18th century.

Background and themes
While the superscript attributes this psalm to the sons of Korah, Christian commentators are undecided about the period in which the psalm was written. One suggestion is that it was penned at the end of the reign of Saul. Alexander Maclaren posits that the setting of Psalm 85 corresponds to the description in the Book of Nehemiah in which only part of the Jewish nation had returned from the Babylonian captivity. They returned "to a ruined city, a fallen Temple, and a mourning land, where they were surrounded by jealous and powerful enemies".

According to Jewish commentators, the sons of Korah are speaking prophetically about the conclusion of the Babylonian exile. They pray that God will also return the Jewish people from their current exile and remove his anger from them altogether. The image of kindness and truth "meeting" alludes to the interrelationship between Israel's truth and God's righteousness. When Israel adheres to the truth, God will respond with righteousness; He will send rain to produce abundant harvests. The International Standard Bible Encyclopedia also interprets the "kiss" shared by Righteousness and Peace (in the KJV translation) as signifying the spiritual union of "God bowing down from heaven to meet earth and earth rejoicing up to Him, foretelling the glory of salvation for the people".

According to the Midrash Tehillim, the land being referred to in this psalm is the Land of Israel, of which Scripture states, "A land which the Lord your God cares for; the eyes of the Lord your God are always upon it". God waits for the Jewish people to perform the mitzvot (biblical commandments) associated with the Land – such as tithing the crops and observing the Shmita (sabbatical year) and Yovel (Jubilee year) – and when they do, both they and the land will find favor in God's eyes.

John Calvin summarizes the message of Psalm 85 as follows. After God's people returned from the Babylonian captivity they were suffering new afflictions. The people's voice in the psalm cries to God for deliverance on three counts: first, as a continuation of God's grace in bringing the people back from captivity, secondly, in view of the long period of their suffering, and lastly, in hope and confidence in the promises of God for blessing. On this last point, Calvin connects the restoration to Israel with the future kingdom of Christ.

Kissing or fighting?
The image of "Justice and Peace kissing" (per the KJV translation;  tseḏeq wə-šālōm nāšāqū) became a popular theme for artworks from the Middle Ages through the 18th century. However, the Hebrew root n-š-q has several translations, including "kiss", "fight", and "fought against each other". According to Eder, the word describes a dynamic type of contact, whether positive or negative.

The Midrash understands this interaction in a turbulent context, relating it to God taking counsel with His ministering angels about whether to create the first man. The Midrash states:
Rabbi Simon said, "When the Holy One, blessed be He, came to create Adam, the ministering angels formed themselves into groups and parties, some of them saying, 'Let him be created,' whilst others urged, 'let him not be created.' Thus it is written, "Chesed [Kindness] and Truth fought together, Righteousness and Peace combated each other". Chesed said, 'Let him be created, because he will dispense acts of love'; Truth said, 'Let him not be created, because he is compounded of falsehood'; Righteousness said, 'Let him be created, because he will perform righteous deeds'; Peace said, 'Let him not be created, because he is full of strife.'

"What did the Holy One do? He took Truth and cast it to the ground. As it says, 'And truth was thrown to the ground...'. The ministering angels said before the Almighty: 'Master of the worlds! Why do You put to shame Your chief of court?' The Almighty replied: 'Let Truth rise from the ground!' This is what is meant when it is written, 'Truth shall grow from the ground'".

Text

Verse numbering
In the Hebrew Bible, Psalm 85:1 comprises the designation
To the chief Musician, A Psalm for the sons of Korah. (KJV)
From then on Psalm 85:1–13 in English versions correspond to verses 2–14 in the Hebrew text.

Hebrew Bible version
Following is the Hebrew text of Psalm 85, with translation from the 1917 JPS Bible:

King James Version
To the chief Musician, A Psalm for the sons of Korah.
 , thou hast been favourable unto thy land: thou hast brought back the captivity of Jacob.
 Thou hast forgiven the iniquity of thy people, thou hast covered all their sin. Selah.
 Thou hast taken away all thy wrath: thou hast turned thyself from the fierceness of thine anger.
 Turn us, O God of our salvation, and cause thine anger toward us to cease.
 Wilt thou be angry with us for ever? wilt thou draw out thine anger to all generations?
 Wilt thou not revive us again: that thy people may rejoice in thee?
 Shew us thy mercy, O , and grant us thy salvation.
 I will hear what God the  will speak: for he will speak peace unto his people, and to his saints: but let them not turn again to folly.
 Surely his salvation is nigh them that fear him; that glory may dwell in our land. 
 Mercy and truth are met together; righteousness and peace have kissed each other.
 Truth shall spring out of the earth; and righteousness shall look down from heaven.
 Yea, the  shall give that which is good; and our land shall yield her increase.
 Righteousness shall go before him; and shall set us in the way of his steps.

Uses

In Judaism
In the Sephardic tradition, Psalm 85 is recited after Kaddish (Titkabel) during the afternoon service on Yom Kippur eve. Sephardi Jews also recite this psalm along with numerous others on Yom Kippur itself.

Verses 5 and 8 (in the Hebrew) are part of Selichot; verse 8 is also recited during the morning service in Pesukei Dezimra.

Psalm 85 is recited to express gratitude, as a prayer for a livelihood, and as a prayer for assistance in times of need.

In Catholicism 
The beginning of Psalm 85 is recommended as an introit or antiphon for Mass on Gaudete Sunday, the third Sunday of Advent. 

The verse “Shew us, O Lord, thy mercy.” (Latin: “Óstende nobis, Dómine, misericórdiam tuam”) is said towards the end of the Prayers at the Foot of the Altar in the Tridentine Mass, also called the Extraordinary Form.

Book of Common Prayer
In the Church of England's Book of Common Prayer, this psalm is appointed to be read in the evening of the 16th day of the month.

Hymns and musical settings 
Paul Gerhardt paraphrased Psalm 85 in a hymn, "Herr, der du vormals hast dein Land", which is part of the Protestant German hymnal Evangelisches Gesangbuch as EG 283.

In 1681/2, Marc-Antoine Charpentier composed a « Benedixisti Domine », H.181, for 3 voices, 2 treble instruments and continuo.

Heinrich Schütz set a German rhymed version in the Becker Psalter, Herr, der du vormals gnädig warst (Lord, you who were merciful before), SWV 182.

Themes from verses 9 to 11 were paraphrased in "The Lord will come and not be slow", a hymn by John Milton.

The Four Virtues 
In verse 10 in the KJV, virtues are described as meeting: "Mercy and truth are met together; righteousness and peace have kissed each other", in erotic imagery, which became a popular theme for artworks from the Middle Ages through the 18th century. These include paintings by Tiepolo, Lanfranco, Pompeo Batoni, Nicolas Prévost, and Laurent de La Hyre. In 2003, American artist John August Swanson produced the work Psalm 85. The verse was also engraved on a papal tiara which Napoleon gave to Pope Pius VII.

The four virtues, Mercy, Truth, Righteousness (or Justice), and Peace, are allegorized as Four Daughters of God. The psalm has also been quoted in nonviolent movements, for example in a 1993 document of Catholic bishops in the United States, for its verse "for he will speak peace unto his people".

References

Sources

External links 

 
 
 Psalms Chapter 85 תְּהִלִּים text in Hebrew and English, mechon-mamre.org
 Text of Psalm 85 according to the 1928 Psalter
 Psalm 85 – Praying for Revival and Restoration text and detailed commentary, enduringword.com
 For the leader. A psalm of the Korahites. / You once favored, LORD, your land, / restored the captives of Jacob. text and footnotes, usccb.org United States Conference of Catholic Bishops
 PSAL. LXXXV. translation by John Milton, dartmouth.edu
 Psalm 85:1 introduction and text, biblestudytools.com
 Psalm 85 / Refrain: Show us your mercy, O Lord. Church of England
 Psalm 85 at biblegateway.com
 Calvin's Commentaries, Vol. 10: Psalms, Part III, tr. by John King, (1847-50) / Psalm 85 sacred-texts.com
 Advent 3: Gaudete in Domino chantblog.blogspot.com 2008
 Charles H. Spurgeon: Psalm 85 detailed commentary, archive.spurgeon.org

085